Mihkel Klaassen (24 February 1880 – 7 March 1952) was a justice of the Supreme Court of Estonia since 1924.

Klaassen was a member of the  that decided the Soviet-era appointment of Johannes Vares as Prime Minister by Konstantin Päts had been illegal and stated, that Jüri Uluots is Prime Minister acting as President of the Estonian Republic on April 20, 1944.

He was the father of Professor Olaf-Mihkel Klaassen of Tartu University.

References 

1880 births
1952 deaths
People from Sindi, Estonia
People from the Governorate of Livonia
20th-century Estonian judges
University of Tartu alumni
20th-century Estonian politicians